Cristian Dumitru Pustai (born 12 October 1967) is a Romanian football manager and former striker.

Club career

Cristian Pustai played as a striker for Gaz Metan Mediaş, Unirea Alba Iulia and Chimica Târnăveni. He is credited for scoring 170 goals for these teams.

Coaching career

Chimica Târnăveni

He began his coaching career at Chimica Târnăveni, towards the end of the 1999–2000 edition of Division B, when he led the team as a playing-coach. He quit his job there after the team was relegated from the Liga III. Afterwards he became a math teacher.

Gaz Metan Mediaş

In 2003, he became a part of Gaz Metan Mediaş's staff, coaching the youth teams.

In 2007 Pustai was appointed head coach of then Liga II club Gaz Metan Mediaş. He managed to win the 2007–08 Liga II in the first season with the team, gaining promotion to the Liga I. In the first division, the team under his guidance had a constant progress.
In the 2011–12 season Gaz Metan Mediaş played in the UEFA Europa League under his command. They managed to knock out Mainz 05, but were subsequently knocked out by Austria Wien.

Pandurii Târgu Jiu
In January 2013, Pustai took over Pandurii Târgu Jiu. At the end of 2012–13 season, Pandurii finished as Liga I runner-up for the first time in the history, becoming the vice-champion of Romania, and qualified for the first time in Europa League. Starting its European adventure from the second qualifying round, Pandurii qualified in the group stage after surprisingly eliminating Sporting Braga with 2–0, after the pandurs were defeated with 0–1. In the group stage, Pandurii failed to win any match, drawing twice with Paços de Ferreira and losing against Fiorentina and Dnipro Dnipropetrovsk. In the championship, Pandurii failed to maintain its position between the first squads, and after a poor series of results which led the team to fall to the sixth place, Pustai resigned from his duties on 23 April 2014.

ASA Târgu Mureș
On 30 September 2014, he signed a contract with ASA Târgu Mureș. He was sacked on 29 December 2014.

Rapid București
On 8 January 2015, he was announced as the new head coach of Rapid București. His objective was to save the team from its precarious position, the 18th in Liga I. He was however sacked on 14 April 2015 due to poor results. He was replaced by Cristiano Bergodi.

Managerial statistics

Honours

Player
Gaz Metan Mediaș
Liga III: 1992–93

Coach
Gaz Metan Mediaș
Liga II: 2015–16

References

External links

1965 births
Living people
Romanian footballers
CS Gaz Metan Mediaș players
CSM Unirea Alba Iulia players
Romanian football managers
CS Gaz Metan Mediaș managers
CS Pandurii Târgu Jiu managers
FC Rapid București managers
ASA 2013 Târgu Mureș managers
FC Botoșani managers
FC Dunărea Călărași managers
FC Gloria Buzău managers
CSM Ceahlăul Piatra Neamț managers
Association football forwards